The seniors' division of the UAAP Season 73 volleyball tournaments opened November 27, 2010. Tournaments are hosted by De La Salle University. Tournament games are held at the Filoil Flying V Arena in San Juan City.

The juniors' division tournaments were held on the first semester of the 2010–11 school year; the UE Pages and the De La Salle Junior Lady Archers won all of their elimination round games in their respective divisions to clinch the championship outright.

Men's tournament

Season's team line-up

Elimination round

Team standings

|- style="text-align:center;background-color:#CCF9CC"
| 1 || style="text-align:left;" |  || 27 || 13 || 1 || 41 || 7 || 5.857 || 1178 || 896 || 1.315 
|- style="text-align:center;background-color:#CCF9CC"
| 2 || style="text-align:left;" |  || 27 || 13 || 1 || 40 || 10 || 4.000 || 1196 || 1005 || 1.190 
|- style="text-align:center;background-color:#BBF3FF"
| 3 || style="text-align:left;" |  || 22 || 8 || 6 || 30 || 21 || 1.429 || 1157 || 1091 || 1.060 
|- style="text-align:center;background-color:#BBF3FF"
| 4 || style="text-align:left;" |  || 22 || 8 || 6 || 29 || 22 || 1.318 || 1143 || 1085 || 1.053 
|- style="text-align:center;"
| 5 || style="text-align:left;" |  || 20 || 6 || 8 || 22 || 26 || 0.846 || 1051 || 1077 || 0.976 
|- style="text-align:center;"
| 6 || style="text-align:left;" |  || 18 || 4 || 10 || 16 || 33 || 0.485 || 998 || 1114 || 0.896 
|- style="text-align:center;"
| 7 || style="text-align:left;" |  || 17 || 3 || 11 || 15 || 38 || 0.395 || 1085 || 1244 || 0.872 
|- style="text-align:center;"
| 8 || style="text-align:left;" |  || 15 || 1 || 13 || 5 || 41 || 0.122 || 831 || 1127 || 0.737 
|-
|}

Schedule

Results
Results to the right and top of the black cells are first round games, those to the left and below are second round games.

Bracket

Semifinals

FEU vs. UP

UST vs. La Salle

Finals

Awards 

 Finals Most Valuable Player: Jayson Ramos (University of Santo Tomas)
 Season Most Valuable Player: John Paul Torres (University of Santo Tomas)
 Rookie of the Year: Peter Den Mar Torres (National University)
 Best Attacker: John Paul Torres (University of Santo Tomas)
 Best Blocker: Niño Jeruz (Adamson University)
 Best Digger: Gilbert Longavela (Adamson University)
 Best Receiver: Paul Jan Doloiras (University of Santo Tomas)
 Best Scorer: John Paul Torres (University of Santo Tomas)
 Best Server: Pitrus Paolo de Ocampo (Far Eastern University)
 Best Setter: Pitrus Paolo de Ocampo (Far Eastern University)

Women's tournament

Season's team line-up

Elimination round

Team standings

|- style="text-align:center;background-color:#CCF9CC"
| 1 || style="text-align:left;" |  || 26 || 13 || 1 || 39 || 7 || 5.571 || 1051 || 779 || 1.349 
|- style="text-align:center;background-color:#CCF9CC"
| 2 || style="text-align:left;" |  || 24 || 10 || 4 || 34 || 20 || 1.700 || 1212 || 1010 || 1.200
|- style="text-align:center;background-color:#BBF3FF"
| 3 || style="text-align:left;" |  || 23 || 9 || 5 || 31 || 21 || 1.476 || 1124 || 1077 || 1.044 
|- style="text-align:center;background-color:#BBF3FF"
| 4 || style="text-align:left;" |  || 22 || 8 || 6 || 29 || 19 || 1.526 || 1057 || 958 || 1.103 
|- style="text-align:center;"
| 5 || style="text-align:left;" |  || 19 || 5 || 9 || 22 || 31 || 0.710 || 1079 || 1125 || 0.959 
|- style="text-align:center;"
| 6 || style="text-align:left;" |  || 19 || 5 || 9 || 22 || 35 || 0.629 || 1125 || 1237 || 0.909 
|- style="text-align:center;"
| 7 || style="text-align:left;" |  || 16 || 3 || 11 || 15 || 37 || 0.405 || 973 || 1203 || 0.809 
|- style="text-align:center;"
| 8 || style="text-align:left;" |  || 16 || 3 || 11 || 14 || 36 || 0.389 || 898 || 1130 || 0.795 
|-
|}

Schedule

Results
Results to the right and top of the black cells are first round games, those to the left and below are second round games.

Forfeiture of games
The UAAP board has suspended 4 women volleyball players for eligibility violations: Carmela Garbin and Clarisse Yeung of De La Salle University, Lorraine Chua of University of the Philippines, and Alyssa Paril of University of the East. However, this decision will affect  the UAAP games they had played, which will be forfeited in this manner:

|-
|}

Bracket 

 if necessary

Semifinals

UST vs. Adamson

La Salle vs. Ateneo

Finals

Awards 

 Finals Most Valuable Player: Charleen Abigail Cruz (De La Salle University)
 Season Most Valuable Player: Jacqueline Alarca (De La Salle University)
 Rookie of the Year: Maria Mikaela Esperanza (De La Salle University)
 Best Attacker: Jacqueline Alarca (De La Salle University)
 Best Blocker: Michele Gumabao (De La Salle University)
 Best Digger: Jennylyn Reyes (National University)
 Best Receiver: Aiza Maizo (University of Santo Tomas)
 Best Scorer: Aiza Maizo (University of Santo Tomas)
 Best Server: Jacqueline Alarca (De La Salle University)
 Best Setter: Jamenea Ferrer (Ateneo de Manila University)

Boys' tournament
With UE sweeping the elimination round, they were declared automatic champions and the playoffs were scrapped.

Elimination round

Team standings
Host team in boldface.

Last game of the eliminations

UE wins the championship by sweeping the tournament.

Awards 

Most Valuable Player: Kim Gerald Relcopan (University of the East)
Rookie of the Year: Edward Camposano (University of the East)
Best Attacker: Mark Carlo Pangan (University of Santo Tomas)
Best Blocker: Carl Michael Manuel (University of the East)
Best Server: Kim Gerald Relcopan (University of the East)
Best Setter: Geuel Asia (University of the East)
Best Receiver: Darren de Dios (University of the East)
Best Libero: Manuel Sumanguid III (National University)

Girls' tournament
With De La Salle sweeping the elimination round, they were declared automatic champions and the playoffs were scrapped.

Elimination round

Team standings
Host team in boldface.

Last game of the eliminations

La Salle wins the championship by sweeping the tournament.

Awards 

Most Valuable Player: Kim Kianna Dy (De La Salle-Santiago Zobel School)
Rookie of the Year: Alessandra Isabel Narciso (De La Salle-Santiago Zobel School)
Best Attacker: Eunique Chan (University of the East)
Best Blocker: Anna Patricia Coronel (De La Salle-Santiago Zobel School)
Best Server: Marie Nicole Vasquez (De La Salle-Santiago Zobel School)
Best Setter: Alexine Danielle Cabanos (De La Salle-Santiago Zobel School)
Best Receiver: Nina Baltazar (University of the East)
Best Libero: Jeannery Leigh Yap (De La Salle-Santiago Zobel School)

See also
 UAAP Season 73

References

2011 in Philippine sport
2010 in Philippine sport
UAAP Season 73
UAAP volleyball tournaments